Bravo-Fernandez v. United States, 580 U.S. ___ (2016), was a case in which the Supreme Court of the United States clarified the application of the Fifth Amendment's Double Jeopardy Clause to cases in which a jury returns irreconcilable verdicts that convict a defendant on one count and acquit a defendant on another count when both counts rely upon the same ultimate fact.

In a unanimous opinion written by Justice Ruth Bader Ginsburg, the Court held that the government may re-try criminal defendants after a jury returns irreconcilable verdicts when the conviction is later vacated because of a procedural error that is unrelated to the inconsistency. Justice Clarence Thomas filed a concurring opinion, stating that although he joins with the majority, the Court should reconsider the two cases that Ginsburg relied on in her argument, Ashe v. Swenson and Yeager v. United States.

See also
 List of United States Supreme Court cases
 List of United States Supreme Court cases, volume 580
 List of United States Supreme Court cases by the Roberts Court

References

External links
 

United States Supreme Court cases
United States Supreme Court cases of the Roberts Court
2016 in United States case law